The PzF 44 (abbreviation for Panzerfaust 44 mm, formally also Leichte Panzerfaust, meaning "Light Armor-fist" (literal translation) or "Light Close-Range Antitank Launcher" (rough formal translation), but also known as Panzerfaust Lanze (lance) and Panzerfaust 2/Panzerfaust II) was a West German portable recoilless shoulder-fired anti-tank rocket launcher with a barrel-caliber of . It was the spiritual successor to the Panzerfaust from World War II and served with the West German Army from the early 1960s to the early 1990s, when it was replaced by the Panzerfaust 3 semi-disposable launcher.

The PzF 44 is called "recoilless" in the sense that it ejects propellant gas rearwards of the chamber upon firing, so called backblast, and not because it truly lacks recoil. Backblast heavily counters recoil but does not fully remove it. The effect of the minimized recoil however is great enough to allow a portable weapon like this to fire large caliber warheads without causing trauma to the user.

History 
The anti-tank grenade launcher was originally developed around 1960 and put into service by the Bundeswehr in 1963. It was developed to provide West German infantry with a modern replacement for the Bazooka that they had previously used.  As such, it was the first German antitank rocket developed after World War II, a conflict in which German hand-held antitank weapons such as the Panzerfaust played a prominent role during 1944–45. The PzF 44 was a product of a period in which the German army was re-equipped with locally developed arms and equipment and retired the aging U.S. gear that had formed their initial arsenal. The full designation name by the German Army is Panzerfaust 44mm DM2 Ausführung 1 Lanze.

Some PzF 44 were used by Nigerian Army during the Biafran War.

Starting in 1992, the PzF 44 was replaced by the Panzerfaust 3.

Specifications 
The PzF 44 could also fire a multi-purpose warhead.

Variants 
Model 44-1 – Initial version of the PzF 44.
Model 44-1A1 – Later version of the PzE 44–1.
Model 44-2 – Later model of the PzF 44.
Model 44-2A1 – Model 44–2 with different sight mount.

Operators

See also 

Panzerschreck
Panzerfaust 3
PSRL-1
Armbrust
MATADOR
RPG-2
RPG-7

References

External links 
Jane's extract on the PzF 44
Leichte Panzerfaust Model 44-2 & 2A1 manual on scribd.com
PzF 44-2A1 ordnance scan on valka.cz

Further reading 
PzF-44 Panzerfaust II "Lanze" blog-article on blogspot.com

Cold War anti-tank rockets of Germany
Military equipment introduced in the 1960s